Maksym Andriyovych Shtayer (born 28 November 1978) is a retired professional Ukrainian football and beach football forward.

Shtayer became the highest scorer when he scored 15 goals for FC Krasyliv during the 2002–03 Ukrainian First League season.

References

External links
 

1978 births
Living people
Ukrainian footballers
Ukrainian Premier League players
FC Nyva Myronivka players
FC Obolon-Brovar Kyiv players
FC Obolon-2 Kyiv players
FC Hirnyk-Sport Horishni Plavni players
FC Krasyliv players
FC Spartak Ivano-Frankivsk players
FC Kalush players
FC Inter Boyarka players
MFC Mykolaiv players
FC Knyazha Shchaslyve players
FC Nyva Bershad players
SC Olkom Melitopol players
FC Ros Bila Tserkva players
Association football forwards